In classical antiquity, a baptisterium was a large basin installed in private or public baths into which bathers could plunge, or even swim about. It is more commonly called natatorium or piscina.

References

Footnotes

Ancient Roman baths